Phycita poteriella is a species of snout moth. It is found in North Macedonia, Greece, Bulgaria, Romania, Croatia, Italy and Spain. It has also been recorded from Israel and Yemen.

The larvae have been recorded feeding on Ricinus communis.

References

Moths described in 1846
Phycitini
Moths of the Arabian Peninsula
Moths of Europe
Moths of Asia